The Rokkaku dako (六角凧) is a traditional six-sided Japanese fighter kite. Traditionally, it is made with bamboo spars and washi paper. The rokkaku kite is often hand painted with the face of a famous Samurai. The structure is a vertically stretched hexagon with a four-point bridle. One bamboo runs from tip to toe, and there are two cross-spars. Flown on a taut string, the kite is stable and rises rapidly. When the line is released, the kite tumbles until tension is put on the line, at which point it takes off in the direction of the spine. Fighting two or more of these kites involves tipping over or destabilizing the opposing kite or cutting its kite line or bridle. Cows are often painted on kites to resemble wealth.

Stability can be increased by bowing the cross spars, making the kite stable enough to fly without a tail. The rokkaku kite is often used for kite aerial photography and in atmospheric science, thanks to its large surface area and simple construction.

External links
 Kite aerial photography page of Scott Haefner describing his rokkaku and other kites
 Using a kite to measure wind speed
 Rokkaku designed for kite aerial photography

Japanese culture
Kites